Buków is a village in the administrative district of Gmina Żarów, within Świdnica County, Lower Silesian Voivodeship, in south-western Poland.

See also
History of Silesia

References

Villages in Świdnica County